Shawclough is a mainly residential area to the north of Rochdale, Greater Manchester, England. Its boundaries are roughly Whitworth Road, Shawclough Road and Healey Corner. Housing is mixed but predominantly owned semi-detached and detached 3-4 bedroom houses. House building over the past 30 years has significantly reduced green spaces, though Healey Dell and Falinge Park are notable areas within Shawclough. Industry in the area is low level, though at one time, manufacturing did take place at the Turner Brothers Asbestos Company in the near vicinity. Shawclough is part of the Healey parish district of Rochdale.

Areas of Rochdale